
A Foreign Policy of Freedom: Peace, Commerce, and Honest Friendship is a 2007 compilation of floor speeches to the U.S. House of Representatives by Congressman Ron Paul. They covered a 30-year period and addressed foreign policy. The book was published as an accompaniment to his campaign for the presidency of the United States in the 2008 election. The first edition includes a foreword by Llewellyn H. Rockwell, Jr. It is published by the Foundation for Rational Economics and Education of Lake Jackson, Texas.

The cover depicts detail from the 1817 painting Declaration of Independence, by John Trumbull, "courtesy of Architect of the Capitol".

Reception
Paul and the book were featured on a crowded The Tonight Show on October 30, 2007, and host Jay Leno was able to get Paul to autograph his copy after the show. By March 2008 it had sold "a brisk 37,000 copies".

References

External links
 OnTheIssues.org's book review and excerpts

2008 non-fiction books
Books by Ron Paul
Political books
Books about ideologies
Books about liberalism
Books about international relations
Books in political philosophy
Books about the 2003 invasion of Iraq
War on Terror books
2008 United States presidential election